Obadiah Danger Tarumbwa (born 25 November 1985 in Bulawayo) is a Zimbabwean football player who plays for Chicken Inn in the Zimbabwe Premier Soccer League as an attacking midfielder.

Career
In February 2008, he signed a 6-month deal with Belgian first division team Cercle Brugge. At Cercle he was reunited with his former Highlanders FC colleagues Vusumuzi Nyoni and Honour Gombami, by whom he was tipped to the Cercle board. He is a member of the Zimbabwe national football team.

His contract with Cercle Brugge was ended on 13 March 2009. He returned to his home country and signed for Bantu Rovers.

On 2 August 2012, Tarumbwa returned to his homeland having been tipped to join Dynamos of Zimbabwe, but turned down the move after failing to agree terms. He joined Cypriot Second Division club Ermis Aradippou and got the number 7 jersey.

On 29 December 2012, Tarumbwa landed in Kenya to sign a two-year contract with 2009 Kenyan Premier League champions Sofapaka. The deal was finalised on 2 January 2013.

He joined University of Pretoria F.C. during the June 2013 TPL mid-season break

International goals
As of match played 11 June 2016. Zimbabwe score listed first, score column indicates score after each Tarumbwa goal.

References

External links
 

1985 births
Living people
Sportspeople from Bulawayo
Zimbabwean footballers
Zimbabwean expatriate footballers
Zimbabwe international footballers
Association football forwards
Cercle Brugge K.S.V. players
Belgian Pro League players
Expatriate footballers in Belgium
Zimbabwean expatriate sportspeople in Belgium
Enosis Neon Paralimni FC players
APOP Kinyras FC players
Ermis Aradippou FC players
Chicken Inn F.C. players
Cypriot First Division players
Cypriot Second Division players
Expatriate footballers in Cyprus
Expatriate footballers in Kenya
Sofapaka F.C. players
Highlanders F.C. players